

eCryptfs (Enterprise Cryptographic Filesystem) is a package of disk encryption software for Linux. Its implementation is a POSIX-compliant filesystem-level encryption layer, aiming to offer functionality similar to that of GnuPG at the operating system level, and has been part of the Linux kernel since version 2.6.19. The eCryptfs package has been included in Ubuntu since version 9.04 to implement Ubuntu's encrypted home directory feature, but is now deprecated

eCryptfs is derived from Erez Zadok's Cryptfs. It uses a variant of the OpenPGP file format for encrypted data, extended to allow random access, storing cryptographic metadata (including a per-file randomly generated session key) with each individual file.

It also encrypts file and directory names which makes them internally longer (average one third). The reason is it needs to uuencode the encrypted names to eliminate unwanted characters in the resulting name.
This lowers the maximum usable byte name length of the original file system entry depending on the used file system (this can lead to four times fewer characters for example for Asian utf-8 file names).

See also 
 Disk encryption
 Disk encryption software
 Comparison of disk encryption software
 EncFS
 dm-crypt
 FileVault
 Encrypting File System

References

External links 
 ArchWiki: System Encryption with eCryptfs
 eCryptfs FAQ
 Cryptfs: A Stackable Vnode Level Encryption File System (Zadok et al., 1999)

Cryptographic software
Disk encryption